Andrew Fox (born 7 November 1962) is a former English cricketer.  Fox was a right-handed batsman who bowled right-arm medium-fast.  He was born in Holmfirth, Yorkshire.

Fox made his debut for Cheshire in the 1987 MCCA Knockout Trophy against Cumberland.  Fox played Minor counties cricket for Cheshire from 1987 to 1991, including 25 Minor Counties Championship matches and 12 MCCA Knockout Trophy matches.  In 1987, he made his List A debut against Glamorgan in the NatWest Trophy.  He played three further List A matches for Cheshire, the last of which came against Hampshire in the 1989 NatWest Trophy.  In his four List A matches, he scored 24 runs at a batting average of 8.00, with a high score of 11.  With the ball he took 8 wickets at a bowling average of 16.62, with best figures of 4/24.  His best figures came against Derbyshire in the 1988 NatWest Trophy.

References

External links
Andrew Fox at ESPNcricinfo
Andrew Fox at CricketArchive

1962 births
Living people
People from Holmfirth
English cricketers
Cheshire cricketers
Cricketers from Yorkshire